Ng Yue Meng (born 21 February 1970) is a retired Singaporean breaststroke swimmer. He competed in three events at the 1988 Summer Olympics.

References

External links
 
 

1970 births
Living people
Singaporean male breaststroke swimmers
Olympic swimmers of Singapore
Swimmers at the 1988 Summer Olympics
Commonwealth Games competitors for Singapore
Swimmers at the 1990 Commonwealth Games
Place of birth missing (living people)
Southeast Asian Games medalists in swimming
Southeast Asian Games gold medalists for Singapore
Southeast Asian Games silver medalists for Singapore
Competitors at the 1987 Southeast Asian Games
20th-century Singaporean people